Arauá is a municipality located in the Brazilian state of Sergipe. Its population was 9,947 (2020) and its area is 193 km².

References

Municipalities in Sergipe